Blake Nelson  is an American author of adult and children's literature. He grew up in Portland, Oregon, and attended Wesleyan University and New York University. He lives in Hillsboro, Oregon, in the Portland metropolitan area.

Biography

Nelson began his career writing short humor pieces for Details magazine in the mid-'90s.  These articles, with titles including "How to be an Expatriot" and "How to Live on $3600 a year", explored the slacker West Coast lifestyle.

His first novel Girl was excerpted in Sassy  magazine in three successive issues. The mail Sassy received in response was key to the eventual publication of Girl. Girl has since been published in eight foreign countries and made into a film of the same name. The novel was reissued as a young adult novel by Simon & Schuster young adult imprint Simon Pulse in October 2007.

Nelson's novel Paranoid Park was made into a film of the same name by Gus Van Sant.  The novel, about skateboarding teenagers, won the prestigious Grinzane Cavour Prize in Italy. The film won a special 60th Anniversary prize at the Cannes Film Festival in 2007.  
  
A sequel to his first novel Girl, Dream School was released in December 2011 and follows the protagonist, Andrea Marr, to Wellington College, an eastern liberal-arts college modeled on Wesleyan, Nelson's alma mater.  The Seattle Stranger called the Girl/Dream School series "The missing link between Bret Easton Ellis and Tao Lin."

Nelson's 2011 novel Recovery Road was adapted by Disney into a TV drama of the same name.  It premiered in January 2016 on ABC Family (Freeform).

Blake Nelson has also contributed poetry, essays and non-fiction to The New York Times, The Quarterly (Gordon Lish), The San Francisco Chronicle, The New York Post and Conde Nast Traveler.

Bibliography
 Girl, Simon & Schuster, 1994, (reissue 2007,2016)
 Exile, Scribners, 1997
 User, Versus Press, 2001
 The New Rules of High School, Penguin, 2003
 Rock Star Superstar, Penguin, 2005
 Prom Anonymous, Penguin, 2006
 Gender Blender, Random House, 2006
 Paranoid Park, Penguin, 2006
 They Came From Below, Tor Books, 2007
 Destroy All Cars, Scholastic Books, 2009
 Recovery Road, Scholastic Books, 2011
 Dream School (GIRL #2), Figment, 2011
 The Prince of Venice Beach, Little Brown, 2014
 The City Wants You Alone (GIRL #3), Amazon Kindle, 2015
 Boy, Simon & Schuster, 2017
 Phoebe Will Destroy You, Simon & Schuster, 2018

References

External links

Recovery Road at Internet Movie Data Base
rookiemag.com interview
xojane.com interview
Dream School review, at nytimes.com
NPR: Fresh Air interview
Hairpin Interview
Teenage Film Interview
Sadie Magazine Interview

Writers from Portland, Oregon
American male screenwriters
Living people
Wesleyan University alumni
Jesuit High School (Beaverton, Oregon) alumni
People from Hillsboro, Oregon
Screenwriters from Oregon
Year of birth missing (living people)